Leon Rice may refer to:

 Leon Rice (footballer), Australian footballer
 Leon Rice (basketball), American basketball coach